The Potomac School is coeducational, college-preparatory independent day school located on a wooded 90-acre campus in McLean, Virginia, United States, three miles (5 km) from Washington, D.C.  Average class size is 15-17 students. For the 2021-22 school year, Potomac enrolled 1,066 students in grades K-12. The school has four divisions – Lower School (K- 3), Middle School (4-6), Intermediate School (7-8), and Upper School (9-12) – each providing a balanced educational experience.

History
At the turn of the 20th century, DC residents Edith Draper Blair, Hetty Fairfax Harrison, and Ellen Warder Thoron traveled to New York City to research John Dewey’s teaching model and educational philosophy. The women’s interest in early childhood education as a joyful and enriching endeavor led them to found The Potomac School in 1904. The school’s original location was in the Dupont Circle  neighborhood of Washington, DC. In 1906, Potomac relocated to 18th and M Streets NW; a decade later, the school – now enrolling students through grade 8 – moved to a larger facility at 2144 California Street in Northwest DC .   

Looking toward greater future expansion, Potomac’s Board of Trustees purchased 55 acres of farmland in McLean, Virginia, in 1948. The ensuing years brought significant growth, with additions of land and facilities, an increase in the student population, and the addition of new programs. In 1987, Potomac added an Upper School to serve students in grades 9-12. The first senior class graduated from The Potomac School in 1990, and in 2004 the school celebrated its Centennial. Enrollment reached 1,000 for the first time in 2009.

Curriculum and Academics

Lower School

The grades K-3 program focuses on reading, writing, and numeracy skills, along with enrichment classes in science, art, music, and physical education. 

Middle School 

Foreign language study and instrumental music are introduced in Middle School. 

Intermediate School

Interscholastic athletics begin at this level. 

Upper School 

The Upper School offers three highly selective, intensive academic tracks – the Science and Engineering Research Center, the Global Perspectives and Citizenship Program, and the Visual and Performing Arts Concentration – that offer opportunities for deeper, more rigorous study in specific areas of interest.

Service Learning

Service learning is integrated into Potomac’s K-12 curriculum.

Co-curricular Activities

The school has a nationally ranked speech and debate program (grades 8-12) and a competitive robotics program (6-12).

Campus
The campus spans 90 acres of woods, ponds, streams, and gardens. The campus includes

 science and computer labs
 three libraries
 art and photography studios
 a performing arts center, with practice and rehearsal rooms and a 470-seat auditorium
 three gymnasiums, fitness facilities, a dance/yoga studio
 grass playing fields, a turf field with a running track, tennis courts, an outdoor pool, and several playgrounds

Spangler Center for Athletics and Community

Opened in fall 2019, Potomac’s newest building – the Spangler Center for Athletics and Community – is a 76,500-square-foot facility that serves as a hub for interscholastic sports, health and wellness activities, and community events.

Athletics
Potomac fields 72 teams playing at various levels in 25 interscholastic sports and is a member of the Mid-Atlantic Athletic Conference (MAC) and the Independent School League (ISL). The school mascot is the Potomac Panther.

Arts
The school has extensive programs in vocal and instrumental music, fine arts, and theater. The school offers extensive arts programming in during the summer season in partnership with the Handwork Studio.

Accreditation and Affiliations
The Potomac School is accredited by the Virginia Association for Independent Schools (VAIS). Additionally, Potomac maintains affiliations and partnerships with a number of organizations, including the National Association of Independent Schools, the Virginia Council for Private Education, the Association of Independent Schools of Greater Washington, Independent School Management, the Council for Advancement and Support of Education, the Head’s Network, the National Business Officers Association, the Parents Council of Washington, the Center for Spiritual and Ethical Education, the Educational Records Bureau, INDEX, Common Sense Media, and Global Online Academy.

Scandal
In 2011, a former Potomac student accused a former Intermediate School teacher and administrator of abusing her in the late 1960s. The accused individual was arrested by Fairfax County police in November 2012. He was convicted in October 2013 of molesting five girls and sentenced to 43 years in prison. In addition to the police probe, The Potomac School initiated an independent investigation, which was completed in June 2014. The school announced that it would turn its findings over to Fairfax County police and would institute comprehensive training in abuse prevention, background checks of all employees and volunteers, and standardized practices for handling abuse complaints. The school fulfilled these commitments and continues to maintain a strong focus on student safety.

Notable alumni
Michael Arndt, screenwriter of Little Miss Sunshine
Chris Ayer, solo guitar artist
Rostam Batmanglij, member of Vampire Weekend
Zal Batmanglij, director of The East
Alice Louise Davison, linguist
Sasha DiGiulian, rock climber
Julie Finley, former ambassador to the Organization for Security and Co-operation in Europe
Davis Guggenheim, writer and director
Sarah Meeker Jensen, architect
Dwaune Jones, professional football coach, Atlanta Falcons
Thomas Kean, politician and businessman
Roger Kent, politician
Nick Lowery, former professional football player, Kansas City Chiefs, New England Patriots, and New York Jets
Robert McDowell, 2-time Federal Communications Commission (FCC) Commissioner
Ellen McLaughlin, playwright
Jon Metzger, vibraphonist
Willie and Truman Morrison, country band Morrison Brothers
Pierre Omidyar, founder of eBay and philanthropist with Omidyar Network
Antonio de Oyarzabal, Spanish diplomat
Adam Platt, New York magazine restaurant critic
Keshia Knight Pulliam, actress best known for playing Rudy Huxtable on The Cosby Show
Lee Radziwill, socialite
Alex Ross, music critic for The New Yorker
Janet Auchincloss Rutherfurd, socialite
Frances Sternhagen, actor in television, theater, and film
Whit Stillman, film director
Nina Auchincloss Straight, author and socialite
Bandar bin Sultan Al Saud, retired Saudi Arabian diplomat
Derek Thompson, journalist, The Atlantic  
Russell E. Train, second administrator of the Environmental Protection Agency

References

External links 
 

Preparatory schools in Virginia
Independent School League
Educational institutions established in 1904
Private K-12 schools in Virginia
McLean, Virginia
1904 establishments in Washington, D.C.